The Journal of Renal Nutrition is a bimonthly peer-reviewed medical journal. It is published by Elsevier on behalf of the International Society of Renal Nutrition and Metabolism and the Council on Renal Nutrition of the National Kidney Foundation. It is abstracted and indexed in MEDLINE/PubMed. According to the Journal Citation Reports, the journal has a 2021 impact factor of 4.354.

According to the journal's official homepage:  "The Journal of Renal Nutrition is devoted exclusively to renal nutrition science and renal dietetics. Its content is appropriate for nutritionists, physicians and researchers working in nephrology. Each issue contains a state-of-the-art review, original research, articles on the clinical management and education of patients, a current literature review, and nutritional analysis of food products that have clinical relevance."

References

External links
 

Elsevier academic journals
Bimonthly journals
English-language journals
Nephrology journals
Publications established in 1991